The Battle of Nebovidy was fought on January 6, 1422 between the Holy Roman Empire and the Hussites, during the second crusade against the Hussites. The Hussites were led by Jan Žižka, while the Imperial forces were led by Emperor Sigismund. The Hussite army surprised a several thousand strong Hungarian troops, part of the Sigismund-led army, resting near the village of Nebovidy (in central Bohemia, near Kolin). The Hungarians had no time to mobilize and regroup and the Hussites were victorious. This was the final battle of a larger conflict – the battle of Kutna Hora.

References

1422 in Europe
Nebovidy 1422
Battles involving the Holy Roman Empire
Battles in Bohemia
Conflicts in 1422
Jan Žižka
History of the Central Bohemian Region